The 2009 UCI Mountain Bike World Cup included three disciplines: cross-country, downhill and four-cross. It was sponsored by Nissan.

Cross-country

Downhill

Four-Cross

See also
2009 UCI Mountain Bike & Trials World Championships

UCI Mountain Bike World Cup
Mountain Bike World Cup